Michel Bolduc (born March 13, 1961) is a Canadian retired ice hockey defenceman. 

Bolduc was born in Ange-Gardien, Quebec. As a youth, he played in the 1974 Quebec International Pee-Wee Hockey Tournament with a minor ice hockey team from Beauport, Quebec City. He played 10 NHL games for the Quebec Nordiques. His son, Jean-Michel Bolduc, was drafted by the Minnesota Wild in the 2003 NHL Entry draft.

Career statistics

References

External links

1961 births
Living people
Canadian ice hockey defencemen
Chicoutimi Saguenéens (QMJHL) players
Fredericton Express players
French Quebecers
Hull Olympiques players
Ice hockey people from Quebec
Maine Mariners players
Quebec Nordiques draft picks
Quebec Nordiques players